The Swedish Evangelical Lutheran Salem Church, also known as Salem Church, in Wakefield, Nebraska, was built during 1905-1906 and was added to the National Register in 1983.  It is a Late Gothic Revival-style church located off Nebraska Highway 35.

References

External links

Lutheran churches in Nebraska
Churches on the National Register of Historic Places in Nebraska
Carpenter Gothic church buildings in Nebraska
Churches completed in 1906
Buildings and structures in Dixon County, Nebraska
Swedish-American culture in Nebraska
National Register of Historic Places in Dixon County, Nebraska
1906 establishments in Nebraska